Guttorm is a masculine Norwegian given name. Notable people with the name include:

Guttorm of Norway (1199–1204), King of Norway
Guttorm Berge (1929–2004), Norwegian alpine skier
Guttorm Fløistad (born 1930), Norwegian philosopher
Guttorm Fløistad (politician) (1878–1953), Norwegian politician
Guttorm Granum (1904–1963), Norwegian politician
Guttorm Gunnhildsson, Norwegian Viking
Guttorm Guttormsen (born 1950), Norwegian musician
Guttorm Guttormsgaard (1938–2019). Norwegian visual artist, educator and art collector
Guttorm Hansen (1920–2009), Norwegian writer and politician
Guttorm Haraldsson, Norwegian noble
Guttorm Schjelderup (born 1961), Norwegian economist
Guttorm Vik (born 1943), Norwegian diplomat

Norwegian masculine given names